Saifur Rahman Bhandari is a politician of Bogra District of Bangladesh and former member of Parliament for Bogra-6 constituency in 1988.

Career 
Bhandari is a businessman. He is the son of Bhandari Shilpa family, a well-known industrial group in Bogra. He was elected to parliament from  Bogra-5 as an Independent candidate in 1988. He was also an independent candidate in the 2019 by-elections. He is the founding president and current advisor of the Bogra District Association.

References 

Living people
Year of birth missing (living people)
People from Bogra District
4th Jatiya Sangsad members